Beetz is a surname. Notable people with the surname include:

 Christof Beetz (1670–1746), ennobled by Emperor Charles VI in Vienna
 Jean Beetz (1927–1991), Canadian lawyer, academic and judge
 Johan Beetz (1874–1949), Canadian naturalist of Belgian origin
 Wilhelm von Beetz (1822–1886), German physicist
 Zazie Beetz (born 1991), German-American actress